The Chathe is a river that flows through the Chümoukedima District of Nagaland, it flows to join the Dhansiri River in Assam which together in turn is a left tributary of the Brahmaputra River.

See also 
 List of rivers of Nagaland

References

External links 

 Rivers of Nagaland
 Chümoukedima district